Muskurake Dekh Zara is a 2010 Indian Hindi-language romantic drama film directed by P. Som Shekar and starring Gashmeer Mahajani, Twinkle Patel, and Hiten Paintal.

Cast 

Gashmeer Mahajani as Vivek 
 Twinkle Patel as Preeti 
Hiten Paintal as Prakash Raj
Sunil Sabarwal as Amar 
Simran Suri as Gauri
 Chirag Sethi
Arijit Sengupta 
Rajshree Choudhary 
 Ranjeet
Om Katare
Jiten Mukhi 
Reshma Merchant 
Tiku Talsania
Mukesh Bhatt
Atul Parchure
Sudesh Lehri 
Khayali

Production 
Hiten Paintal plays a negative role for the first time in his career.

Reception  
A critic from Koimoi wrote that "On the whole, Muskurake Dekh Zara will not give the audience and those connected with the film reason to smile even meekly". A critic from The Times of India opined that "So, is there anything to talk about when it comes to Muskurake Dekh Zara? Nothing". Taran Adarsh of Bollywood Hungama stated that "On the whole, MUSKURAKE DEKH ZARA has no chances absolutely".

References 

2010 films
2010s Hindi-language films
2010 romantic drama films
Indian romantic drama films